The 2021 South Dakota State Jackrabbits football team represented the South Dakota State University as a member of the Missouri Valley Football Conference during the 2021 NCAA Division I FCS football season. The Jackrabbits were led by 25th-year head coach John Stiegelmeier and played their home games on campus at Dana J. Dykhouse Stadium in Brookings, South Dakota.

The Jackrabbits were 8–3 (5–3 in MVC, third) in the regular season and advanced to the FCS semifinals, but lost at Montana State to finish at 11–4.

After the season, offensive coordinator Jason Eck was hired as the head coach at Idaho in the Big Sky Conference.

Schedule

Roster

Ranking movements

Players drafted into the NFL

References

South Dakota State
South Dakota State Jackrabbits football seasons
2021 NCAA Division I FCS playoff participants
South Dakota State Jackrabbits football